Pravachakan is a Malayalam movie released in 1993 under the direction of P. G. Viswambharan. The films has notable actors like Mukesh, Siddique, Shenbaga, Keerikkadan Jose, Mamukkoya, Narendra Prasad and Rajan P. Dev. This movie has received mixed reviews from critics and audience.

Plot
Balagopalan aka Balu is from a family of fortune-tellers but he does not like the profession and his ambition is to act in movies. He joins Oscar acting school to learn acting along with his friends. He has hidden his poor family background from his friends.  He falls in love with Deepty, whose father is a powerful and influential man. His friend Benny's father is Kurian MLA, who runs many illegal businesses and Balu and his friends get beaten up by goons taking revenge against Kurian. Balu's father works as a bird fortune teller on the road but he is out of work and struggling.  Balu and friends plan on directing and acting in a movie, sponsored by a Singapore producer. His father passes away leaving a family and financial burdens. Their filmmaking plans do not work out. His responsibility towards his family leads him to start his parrot fortune-teller career on the roadside.
Some of his predictions become true and thereby he becomes famous. His successful life has a turning point when the finance minister of the state is kidnapped. The public thinks the minister is kidnapped by Balu's friend's father Kurian. The story revolves around the mystery behind the kidnapping.

Cast

Mukesh as Balagopalan / Balu
Siddique as Prakashan
Keerikkadan Jose as Freddy
Mamukkoya as Jaffer Sherif
Rajeev Rangan as Benny
Narendra Prasad as MLA Kurian
Shenbaga as Deepthi (Balu's love of interest)
Kuthiravattam Pappu as Sathyaseelan
Rajan P. Dev as Menon
Philomina as Balau's grandmother
Mala Aravindan as Velandi
M. S. Thripunithura as Chief Minister of Kerala
Paravoor Bharathan Deepthi's uncle
Bobby Kottarakkara as Daniel
Jagannathan as Finance Minister Chackochan
Sashikumar as Madanlal
Maniyanpilla Raju as himself
Beena Antony as Kusumam
Suma Jayaram as Balu's sister
Machan Varghese
Kalabhavan Haneef

References

External links

 

1993 films
1990s Malayalam-language films
Films directed by P. G. Viswambharan